A spare part is an item of inventory used to replace failed parts.

Spare Parts may also refer to:

 Spare Parts (album), by Status Quo
 Spare Parts (Doctor Who), Doctor Who audio drama.
 Spare Parts (EP), by Servotron
 Spare Parts (2003 film), Slovenian film
 Spare Parts (2015 film), film formerly titled La Vida Robot
 Spare Parts (song), by Bruce Springsteen
 Spare Parts (video game), platform video game by Electronic Arts
 "Spare Parts", episode of Yes, Dear
Spare Parts, the international title of the 1979 film Fleisch